The Antilles (Jamaican Patois: Antiliiz) is an archipelago bordered by the Caribbean Sea to the south and west, the Gulf of Mexico to the northwest, and the Atlantic Ocean to the north and east.

The Antillean islands are divided  into two smaller groupings: the Greater Antilles and the Lesser Antilles. The Greater Antilles includes the larger islands of the Cayman Islands, Cuba, Hispaniola (subdivided into the nations of the Dominican Republic and Haiti), Jamaica, and Puerto Rico. The Lesser Antilles contains the northerly Leeward Islands and the southeasterly Windward Islands as well as the Leeward Antilles just north of Venezuela. The Lucayan Archipelago (consisting of The Bahamas and the Turks and Caicos Islands), though a part of the West Indies, is generally not included among the Antillean islands.

Geographically, the Antillean islands are generally considered a subregion of North America. Culturally speaking, Cuba, the Dominican Republic, and Puerto Rico – and sometimes the whole of the Antilles – are included in Latin America, although some sources use the phrase "Latin America and the Caribbean" instead (see Latin America, "In Contemporary Usage"). In terms of geology, the Greater Antilles are made up of continental rock, as distinct from the Lesser Antilles, which are mostly young volcanic or coral islands.

Background 

The word Antilles originated in the period before the European colonization of the Americas, Antilia being one of those mysterious lands which figured on the medieval charts, sometimes as an archipelago, sometimes as continuous land of greater or lesser extent, its location fluctuating in mid-ocean between the Canary Islands and India.

After the 1492 arrival of Christopher Columbus's expedition in what was later called the West Indies, the European powers realized that the dispersed lands constituted an extensive archipelago in the Caribbean Sea and the Gulf of Mexico. The Antilles were called multiple names before their current name became the norm. Early Spanish visitors called them the Windward Islands (today having a narrower definition). They were also called the Forward Islands by 18th-century British. Thereafter, the term Antilles was commonly assigned to the formation, and "Sea of the Antilles" became a common alternative name for the Caribbean Sea in various European languages.

Countries and territories

Lucayan Archipelago 

 The Bahamas
 Turks and Caicos Islands (United Kingdom)

Greater Antilles 

 Cayman Islands (United Kingdom)
 Cuba
 Isle of Youth
 Hispaniola
 Haiti
 Dominican Republic
 Jamaica
 Puerto Rico (United States)

Lesser Antilles

Leeward Antilles 

 Aruba (Kingdom of the Netherlands)
 Bonaire (Netherlands)
 Curaçao (Kingdom of the Netherlands)
 Federal Dependencies of Venezuela
 Aves Island
 Los Monjes Archipelago
 La Tortuga Island
 La Sola Island
 Los Testigos Islands
 Los Frailes Islands
 Patos Island
 Los Roques Archipelago
 Blanquilla Island
 Los Hermanos Archipelago
 Orchila Island
 Las Aves Archipelago
 Nueva Esparta State (Venezuela)
 Margarita Island
 Coche
 Cubagua

Leeward Islands 

 Anguilla (United Kingdom)
 Antigua and Barbuda
 Antigua
 Barbuda
 Redonda
 British Virgin Islands (United Kingdom)
 Guadeloupe (France)
 La Désirade
 Les Saintes
 Marie-Galante
 Montserrat (United Kingdom)
 Saba (Netherlands)
 Saint Barthélemy (France)
 Saint Martin
 Collectivity of Saint Martin (France)
 Sint Maarten (Kingdom of the Netherlands)
 Saint Kitts and Nevis
 Saint Kitts
 Nevis
 Sint Eustatius (Netherlands)
 Spanish Virgin Islands (Puerto Rico)
 United States Virgin Islands (United States)
 Saint Croix
 Saint Thomas
 Saint John

Windward Islands 

 Dominica
 Grenada
 Martinique (France)
 Saint Lucia
 Saint Vincent and the Grenadines

Other islands 
 Barbados
 Trinidad and Tobago
 Tobago
 Trinidad

See also
 Antillia

References 

 
 
International archipelagoes